S-number may refer to

 In Mahler's classification, a number with finite measure of transcendence
 Meter Point Administration Number
 Singular value of a compact operator